Malayalappuzha Devi Temple is a Bhadrakali temple situated at Malayalappuzha in Pathanamthitta in Kerala, India. It is believed that the temple was built more than 1000 years ago.

In the temple, Bhadrakali is seen in a ferocious form soon after the killing of the demon, Darika.  The main idol is 5.5 feet high, made from katu sarkara yogam. In addition to this idol, two other idols are also erected inside the sanctum sanctorum; one used for abhisheka and the other for sreebali, a daily ritual.

WORSHIPING

Malayalapuzha Devi is believed to grant boons for extending prosperity to all the devotees. The goddess is worshiped for protecting the devotee from enemies, getting the unmarried girls married, obtaining job for the unemployed, and helping businesses flourish. This popular belief and faith makes the temple visited by devotees from far locations. The devi is also known as Goddess Idathattil Bhagwathi

Legend
Once upon a time, two people belonging to the Namboothiri caste of northern Travancore were meditating at Mookambika temple. They had with them an idol of Bhadrakali. After their meditation for a prolonged period, they received an oracle from Bhadrakali that the idol will have her perpetual presence. The Namboothiris continued their pilgrimage with the idol in their possession. As they became too old to continue their pilgrimage, Bhadrakali appeared before them and advised that Malayalappuzha was the ideal place to erect the idol. Following her advice, the Namboothiris reached Malayappuzha and erected the idol.

Features 

Malayalapuzha Devi Temple features beautiful wall paintings and artistic stone carvings. The temple features a unique statue of Goddess Parvati feeding baby Ganapathy on her lap. An idol of Veera Bhadra can be seen on the entry to the sanctum. Sub deities in the temple are Brahma Rakshas, Nagaraja and a swayambu Shiva Linga.

Festival 

The annual festival is celebrated for 11 days. The festival starts on the Thiruvathira nakshtra in the Kumba masam (February – March). Kathakali is conducted on the fourth and fifth day.

Visiting Hours

The temple is open for darshan from 5 AM to 1 PM and in the evening 5 PM to 8 PM.

Contact Details

Malayalapuzha Devaswam Phone Number is +91 468 2300260

How to Reach 

Chengannur Railway Station, around 33 km, is the nearest major station for those coming in train. Thiruvalla Railway Station is 38.5 km away. Trivandrum International Airport is the nearest air terminal around 107 km away.

References

External links
 https://www.templespedia.com/malayalappuzha-devi-kerala/

Hindu temples in Pathanamthitta district
Devi temples in Kerala